Red Oak Creek is a stream in the U.S. state of Georgia. It is a tributary to the Flint River.

Red Oak Creek was named for the red oak timber lining its banks.

References

Rivers of Georgia (U.S. state)
Rivers of Meriwether County, Georgia